Stephen Hendrie (born 8 January 1995) is a Scottish professional footballer who plays as a left back for Queen of the South.

He began his career with Hamilton Academical, making over 100 appearances for the club before moving to West Ham United in July 2015. He moved on loan to Southend United in January 2016. After a loan spell with Blackburn Rovers during the 2016–17 season, Hendrie returned to the Shrimpers on a permanent basis in June 2017. Hendrie spent time on loan with Motherwell in 2018, and after his release from the Roots Hall club, he signed for Kilmarnock in September 2019. After a season with Morecambe, Hendrie signed for Partick Thistle in September 2021.

Hendrie is a Scotland youth international and has played at under-21 level.

Club career

Hamilton Academical
Born in Glasgow where he attended St Andrew's Secondary School, Hendrie began his career at Hamilton Academical. He made his club debut on 23 July 2011 in the Scottish Challenge Cup first round, replacing Derek Lyle after 60 minutes of an eventual 2–0 victory over Queen's Park at Hampden Park, and his Scottish Football League debut two weeks later, starting a 2–1 win at Ayr United on the first day of the new First Division season. At the end of the 2011–12 season, his first with the club's senior team, Hendrie described his year as a "dream." Hendrie described the next season, the 2012–13 season, as "[not] my best season" due to injuries and subsequent lack of playing time.

On 8 February 2014, he was sent off in the 50th minute of a 1–0 defeat at Dundee for a foul on Martin Boyle, with teammate Ziggy Gordon being dismissed later on. He was also given a red card on 12 April, in a 1–1 draw away to Livingston. Hamilton ended the season promoted from the Championship to the Scottish Premiership via the play-offs, and Hendrie made his top-flight debut on 9 August 2014, starting in a 0–2 home defeat to Inverness Caledonian Thistle on the opening day of the season. He played 30 league matches throughout the season, and was sent off on 24 September in the League Cup third round, a goalless draw with Motherwell at New Douglas Park, although his team won the penalty shootout.

West Ham United
In January 2015 he was linked with a transfer away from the club. Later that month a transfer to English club West Ham United was discussed, although it collapsed a day later. A few days later the deal was announced as back on. On 30 January 2015, Hendrie signed a pre-contract agreement to join West Ham on 1 July 2015.

On 15 January 2016 Hendrie joined League One side Southend United on an initial 31-day loan to cover for injured, regular left-back Ben Coker. He made his Southend debut on 16 January in a 0–0 draw away against Peterborough United. Hendrie scored his first goal in professional football when he netted the winner in a 2–1 victory against Shrewsbury Town on 2 February 2016 

Hendrie joined Championship side Blackburn Rovers on loan for the 2016–17 season.

Southend United
On 29 June 2017 Hendrie returned to Southend United, signing a two-year contract.

On 31 January 2018, Hendrie moved on loan to Motherwell until the end of the 2017–18 season.

He was released by Southend at the end of the 2018–19 season.

Kilmarnock
In September 2019 he signed a one-year contract with Kilmarnock. He was released by the club at the end of the 2019–20 season.

Morecambe
On 1 August 2020, he signed a one-year deal with League Two club Morecambe, with manager Derek Adams calling him a "good fit" for the club. He was released by Morecambe at the end of the season, and was linked with a transfer to Bradford City, to join up with former Morecambe manager Derek Adams's new club.

Partick Thistle
Hendrie signed for Partick Thistle in September 2021.

Queen of the South
On 12 August 2022, after a short period without a club, Hendrie signed a one-year contract with Queen of the South.

International career

Hendrie received his first international call up, to the Scotland under-17 squad on 12 October 2011.

In May 2012, Hendrie was called up to the Scotland under-20 squad for a youth tournament in the Netherlands, where he appeared in three of the tournament's five matches.

He made his international debut for the under-21s in September 2014.

Personal life
Hendrie is a Celtic supporter.

Career statistics

References

1995 births
Living people
Scottish footballers
Hamilton Academical F.C. players
West Ham United F.C. players
Southend United F.C. players
Blackburn Rovers F.C. players
Motherwell F.C. players
Kilmarnock F.C. players
Morecambe F.C. players
Scottish Football League players
Scottish Professional Football League players
English Football League players
Association football fullbacks
Scotland youth international footballers
Scotland under-21 international footballers
Partick Thistle F.C. players
Queen of the South F.C. players